Luncke expedition (1957–1958) was an Antarctica expedition with a team led by the Norwegian Bernhard Luncke and based at Norway Station. The team conducted observations in meteorology, atmospheric science and glaciology. Extensive aerial photography was carried out and the resulting maps were published by the Norwegian Polar Institute. These findings are still used in some maps.

See also
List of Antarctic expeditions

References

1957 in Norway
1957 in Antarctica
Norway and the Antarctic
Antarctic expeditions
Expeditions from Norway
1958 in Norway
1958 in Antarctica